Jerry Johnson (born November 23, 1942) is an American politician who served as a member of the Nebraska Legislature from the 23rd district. Johnson was previously the mayor of Wahoo.

Johnson was born in Holdrege, Nebraska. He attended Luther Junior College.

Elections
2012 When Senator Chris Langemeier retired and left the District 23 seat open, Johnson placed first in the May 15, 2012 Primary election with 3,323 votes, and won the November 6, 2012 General election with 8,032 votes against Vern Barrett, who had previously run for the seat in 2008.

References

External links
Official page at the Nebraska Legislature
Campaign site
 

1942 births
Living people
Mayors of places in Nebraska
Nebraska state senators
People from Holdrege, Nebraska
People from Wahoo, Nebraska
21st-century American politicians